The following is the qualification system and qualified countries for the Bowling at the 2023 Pan American Games competitions.

Qualification system
A total of 50 bowlers will qualify to compete. Each nation may enter a maximum of 4 athletes (two per gender). The champions of the 2021 Junior Pan American Games will only be able to compete in the individual events of the Santiago 2023 Pan American Games. If the athletes who qualified at the Cali 2021 Junior Pan American Games do not participate in the Santiago 2023 Pan American Games, this spot will be nominal blocked and cannot be transferred to another NOC or athlete. Qualified athletes at the Cali 2021 Junior Pan American Games will not be able to obtain another slot for their NOC; however, another athlete may compete for another slot through the Santiago 2023 qualification system within the maximum quota per NOC. In each gender there will be a total of 12 pairs qualified, with one spot per event (so a total of four bowlers) reserved for the host nation Chile. There will be a total of four qualification events. Each nation could only enter two qualification events per gender.

Qualification timeline

Qualification summary

Men

Women

References

B
Qualification for the 2023 Pan American Games
Bowling at the 2023 Pan American Games